The 2005 Tour de la Région Wallonne was the 32nd edition of the Tour de Wallonie cycle race and was held from 25 July to 29 July 2005. The race started in Brussels and finished in Namur. The race was won by Luca Celli.

General classification

References

Tour de Wallonie
Tour de la Région Wallonne